Subeucalanus pileatus is a tropical and subtropical copepod.

Description

Distribution
S. pileatus is found around in world in subtropical and tropical waters.

Ecology

Life cycle and reproduction
S. pileatus reproduces continuously, and is active throughout the year. In June and July in the Gulf of Mexico, copepodite stages I through III are found in the layer below the surface with the highest concentrations of chlorophyll a. Adults and copepodite stages IV and V, on the other hand, are uncommon during this time.

References

Calanoida